WRNR (740 kHz) is a news–talk–sports formatted broadcast radio station licensed to Martinsburg, West Virginia, serving Martinsburg and Berkeley County, West Virginia.  WRNR is owned and operated by Shenandoah Communications, Inc.

740 AM is a Canadian clear-channel frequency on which CFZM in Toronto, Ontario, is the dominant Class A station.  WRNR must lower its wattage from sunset to sunrise to protect the nighttime skywave signal of CFZM.

Translator
In addition to the main stations at 740 kHz, WRNR is relayed by an FM translator to widen its broadcast area.

References

External links
 Talk Radio WRNR Online
 
 
 

1976 establishments in West Virginia
Martinsburg, West Virginia
Mass media in Hagerstown metropolitan area
News and talk radio stations in the United States
Radio stations established in 1976
RNR